Daniel Victor Snaith (born March 29, 1978) is a Canadian composer, musician, and recording artist. He has released 10 studio albums since 2000 and has recorded and performed under the stage names Caribou, Manitoba, and Daphni.

Career 
Snaith originally recorded under the stage name Manitoba, but after being threatened with a lawsuit by Richard "Handsome Dick" Manitoba in 2004, Snaith changed his performance name to Caribou. Snaith's previous full-length albums were then re-released under the new moniker.

When playing gigs as Caribou, Snaith performs with a live band. Currently, the live band consists of Snaith, Ryan Smith, Brad Weber, and John Schmersal. Caribou have toured worldwide since the early 2000s and performed at festivals including Coachella, Glastonbury, Primavera Sound, Field Day, Bonnaroo, All Points East, Reading and Leeds, Parklife, Osheaga, amongst many others. In 2012, Caribou supported Radiohead on their ‘King of Limbs’ tour. When performing as Daphni, Snaith performs as a DJ.  "I'm not the type of person who takes physical things apart and plays around with them, but I like taking mental ideas apart and playing around with them. That's what appeals to me about what I've spent my life doing", said Snaith in an interview. 

Caribou's 2007 album Andorra won the 2008 Polaris Music Prize, and his subsequent Caribou albums Swim (2010), Our Love (2014) and Suddenly (2020) have appeared on the Polaris Music Prize shortlist.

In 2011, looking for an outlet for more dancefloor influenced output, began releasing music under the name Daphni. He has released 3 studio albums under this alias - Jiaolong (2012), Joli Mai (2017) and Cherry (2022). 

In December 2011, Caribou curated the All Tomorrow's Parties "Nightmare Before Christmas" festival in Minehead, England, alongside co-curators Battles and Les Savy Fav.

Caribou was awarded Essential Mix of the Year in 2014 by Mixmag for his "Essential Mix" on 18 October 2014.

Caribou's 2014 album Our Love received the IMPALA Album of the Year Award.

In 2015, Caribou’s album Our Love was nominated for a Grammy for ‘Best Electronic/Dance Album’ and in 2021 Caribou’s single ‘You Can Do it' was nominated for the Grammy for ‘Best Dance Recording’.

In 2011, 2015 and 2021 Caribou’s albums Swim, Our Love and Suddenly won the Juno Award for Electronic Album of the Year.

In 2021 he also received the Libera Awards as Best Dance/Electric Record 2021 for his album Suddenly (Merge Records) by the American Association of Independent Music (A2IM).

Personal life
In 2005, Snaith received a PhD degree in mathematics from Imperial College London, for work on Overconvergent Siegel Modular Symbols under Kevin Buzzard. Snaith described his work ironically in a modest manner as "original, but I would still call it trivial."
He is the son of mathematician  and brother of mathematician Nina Snaith.

Discography

Studio albums

as Manitoba 
 Start Breaking My Heart (2001)
 Up in Flames (2003)

as Caribou 
 The Milk of Human Kindness (2005)
 Andorra (2007)
 Swim (2010)
 Our Love (2014)
 Suddenly (2020)

as Daphni 
 Jiaolong (2012)
 FabricLive.93 (2017)
 Joli Mai (2017)
 Cherry (2022)

EPs

as Manitoba 
 People Eating Fruit EP (30 October 2000)
 give'r EP (26 November 2001)
 If Assholes Could Fly This Place Would Be an Airport 12" (13 January 2003)

Most of Snaith's older Manitoba material has been subsequently rereleased under the Caribou name.

as Caribou 
 Tour CD 2005 (2005) Super Furry Animals Tour
 Marino EP (2005)
 Tour CD 2007 (2007)
 Tour CD 2010 (2010)
 Caribou Vibration Ensemble (2010, ATP) Live album featuring Marshall Allen. Caribou 'side project'.
 CVE Live 2011 EP (2014) Caribou Vibration Ensemble. Caribou 'side project'.

as Daphni 
 Resident Advisor, February 2011 (5 tracks of episode #246)
 Daphni Edits Vol. 1, 12"  [Resista], March 2011
 Pinnacles / Ye Ye, 12" split with Four Tet [Text], March 2011
 Daphni Edits Vol. 2, 12" [Resista], August 2011
 JIAOLONG001, 12" [Jiaolong], October 2011
 Ahora, 12" [Amazing Sounds], November 2011
 Julia / Tiberius, 12" featuring Owen Pallett [Jiaolong], April 2014
 Sizzling EP, June, 2019

Singles

as Manitoba 
 "Paul's Birthday" CDS (26 February 2001)
 "Jacknuggeted" CDS (24 February 2003)
 "Hendrix with Ko" CDS (14 July 2003)

as Caribou 
 "Yeti" CDS/12" (22 March 2005)
 "Barnowl" (2005)
 "Melody Day" CDS (August 2007)
 "She's the One" (March 2008)
 "Eli" (2008)
 "Odessa" (24 April 2010)
 "Leave House" (2010)
 "Bowls" (19 July 2010)
 "Can't Do Without You" (15 July 2014)
 "Our Love" (September 2014)
 "Your Love Will Set You Free" (2014)
 "All I Ever Need" (2014)
 "Mars" (2015)
 "Home" (2019)
 "You and I" (2020)
 "Never Come Back" (2020)
 “You Can Do It” (August 2021)

as Daphni 
"Sizzling" (2019)
"Cherry" (2022)
"Cloudy" (2022)
"Clavicle" (2022)
"Mania" (2022)

Music Videos 
as Caribou
 Marino: The Videos DVD (2005) 16 videos for 'Up In Flames' (8), and 'Milk Of Human Kindness' (8), and 'The Milk Of Human Kindness (Story Edit)' featurette.
 Can't Do Without You - 2014
 Sun - 2010
 Odessa - 2010
 You Can Do It - 2021

Awards and recognition
 2007 Top Heatseekers – No. 5 (Andorra)
 2007 Billboard Top Independent Albums – No. 26 (Andorra)
 2008 Polaris Music Prize – winner (Andorra)
 2010 Polaris Music Prize – short list (Swim)
 2010 Billboard 200 – No. 97 (Swim)
 2010 Billboard Top Independent Albums – No. 14 (Swim)
 2011 Juno Awards – winner, Electronic Album of the Year (Swim)
 2014 Mixmag Essential Mix of the Year
 2015 IMPALA Album of the Year Award (Our Love)
 2015 Juno Awards – winner, Electronic Album of the Year (Our Love)
 2015 Polaris Music Prize – short list (Our Love)
 2021 Juno Awards – winner, Electronic Album of the Year (Suddenly)
 2020 Polaris Music Prize – short list (Suddenly)

See also

Canadian rock
List of Canadian musicians

References

External links

 
 Caribou on The Leaf Label
 
 

Living people
Canadian techno musicians
Folktronica musicians
University of Toronto alumni
Alumni of Imperial College London
Canadian expatriates in the United Kingdom
Polaris Music Prize winners
Juno Award for Electronic Album of the Year winners
Musicians from Hamilton, Ontario
Intelligent dance musicians
Shoegaze musicians
People from Dundas, Ontario
1978 births
Merge Records artists
City Slang artists
Domino Recording Company artists